Gloria Privileggio (born 18 July 1988) is a Greek long-distance runner. She competed in the Marathon at the 2019 World Athletics Championships in Doha, finishing in the 29th place. A former swimmer, she got involved in running in 2013.

Her personal best (2:35:28) ranks her third among all-time Greek female marathon runners.

In 2021, she won the Athens Classic Marathon with a time of 2:41.30.

Personal
Privileggio was born in Greece to parents from Istanbul. Her father is of Italian ancestry.

Competition record

References

1988 births
Living people
Greek female long-distance runners
Greek female marathon runners
Greek people of Italian descent
Place of birth missing (living people)
World Athletics Championships athletes for Greece